Jacques-Christophe Valmont de Bomare (born 17 September 1731, Rouen; died 24 August 1807, Paris) was a French botanist and naturalist. He wrote an influential encyclopedia of natural history in the 1760s: Dictionnaire raisonné universel d’histoire naturelle (6 volumes, Paris, Chez Lacombe, 1764–1768).

Works

References 

1731 births
1807 deaths
19th-century French botanists
French naturalists
Scientists from Rouen
Burials at Père Lachaise Cemetery
18th-century French botanists